The eastern indigo snake (Drymarchon couperi) is a species of large, non-venomous snake in the family Colubridae. Native to the southeastern region of the United States, it is the longest native snake species in North America.

Taxonomy and etymology

Taxonomy
The eastern indigo snake was first described by John Edwards Holbrook in 1842. For many years the genus Drymarchon was considered monotypic with one species, Drymarchon corais, with 12 subspecies, until the early 1990s when Drymarchon corais couperi was elevated to full species status according to the Society for the Study of Amphibians and Reptiles, in their official names list.

Etymology
The generic name, Drymarchon, roughly translates to "lord of the forest". It is composed of the Greek words drymos (Δρυμός), meaning "forest", and archon (ἄρχων), meaning "lord" or "ruler".

The specific name is a latinization of the surname of American planter James Hamilton Couper (1794-1866). Couper brought Holbrook the type specimen from south of the Altamaha River in Wayne County, Georgia.

Common names
The eastern indigo snake has a number of common names including indigo snake, blue indigo snake, black snake, blue gopher snake, and blue bull snake.

Description
The eastern indigo snake has uniform blue-black dorsal scales, with some specimens having a reddish-orange to tan color on the throat, cheeks, and chin. This snake received its common name from the glossy iridescent dorsal and ventral scales which can be seen as blackish-purple in bright light. This smooth-scaled snake is considered to be the longest native snake species in the United States and all of North America. The longest recorded specimen measured  in total length (including tail). Unlike many snakes, mature male indigo snakes are slightly larger than females. This is thought to be due to intraspecies competition and combat with the males. Although the eastern indigo snake is similar in average body mass, extremely large specimens of the bulky, co-occurring venomous eastern diamondback rattlesnake can outweigh it.

Distribution
The eastern indigo snake inhabits areas from far southwestern South Carolina through Florida, and west to southern Alabama and southeastern Mississippi. Their historic range extended into Louisiana. A related species, the Texas indigo snake (Drymarchon melanurus erebennus), is found in southern Texas and Mexico.

Conservation status
Because of habitat loss, the eastern indigo snake is listed as a federally threatened species in Georgia and Florida. In 2012 the Alabama Department of Conservation and Natural Resources had listed the species as possibly extirpated within the state. A reintroduction program has shown initial signs of success, with an individual sighted in March 2022.

The eastern indigo snake was largely eliminated from northern Florida due to habitat loss and fragmentation. A restoration program is currently underway at Apalachicola Bluffs and Ravines Preserve (ABRP) in northern Florida. The eastern indigo snake was last observed at ABRP in 1982, until 2017 when 12 snakes were released as part of the program. Twenty more snakes were released in 2018, and another 15 (10 female and 5 male) in 2019. The 10-year program is a collaborative effort between the Florida Wildlife Commission and private partners.

NatureServe considers the species to be Vulnerable.

Preferred habitat
The eastern indigo snake frequents flatwoods, hammocks, dry glades, stream bottoms, cane fields, riparian thickets, and high ground with well-drained, sandy soils. In Georgia, the eastern indigo snake prefers excessively drained, deep sandy soils along major streams, as well as xeric sandridge habitats. In the northern parts range is restricted to sandhills and require Gopher Tortoise burrows during colder seasons  Xeric slash pine plantations seem to be preferred over undisturbed longleaf pine habitats. Habitat selection varies seasonally. From December to April, eastern indigo snakes prefer sandhill habitats; from May to July the snakes shift from winter dens to summer territories; from August through November they are located more frequently in shady creek bottoms than during other seasons. In a study in Georgia, winter sightings generally occurred on sandhills, in association with gopher tortoise (Gopherus polyphemus) burrows. These burrows can be used as cover from predators, fires, or extreme temperatures that may come through the area.

The eastern indigo snake is most abundant in the sandhill plant communities of Florida and Georgia. These communities are primarily scrub oak-longleaf pine (Pinus palustris) with occasional live oak (Quercus virginiana), laurel oak (Q. laurifolia), Chapman's oak (Q. chapmanii), and myrtle oak (Q. myrtifolia). Other communities include longleaf pine-turkey oak (Q. laevis), slash pine-scrub oak (Pinus elliottii), pine flatwoods, and pine-mesic hardwoods.

Cover requirements
Because the cover requirements of eastern indigo snakes change seasonally, maintaining corridors that link the different habitats used is important. From the spring through fall snakes must be able to travel from sandhill communities and upland pine-hardwood communities to creek bottoms and agricultural fields. In winter, indigo snakes den in gopher tortoise burrows, which are usually found in open pine forests with dense herbaceous understories. Burrows need to be in areas where there is no flooding. Eastern indigo snakes heavily use debris piles left from site-preparation operations on tree plantations. These piles are often destroyed for cosmetic reasons but should be left intact because they provide important hiding cover for both the snake and its prey.

Food habits and behavior
The eastern indigo snake is carnivorous, like all snakes, and will eat any other small animal it can overpower. It has been known to kill some of its prey by pressing the prey against nearby burrow walls. Captive specimens are frequently fed dead items to prevent injury to the snake from this violent method of subduing its prey. Chemosensory studies with mice (Mus musculus) have shown that D. couperi responds with significantly elevated rates of tongue
flicking and investigation towards visual cues of prey, and not volatile chemical cues. Its diet has been known to include other snakes (ophiophagy), including venomous ones, as it is immune to the venom of the North American rattlesnakes. The eastern indigo snake also eats turtles, lizards, frogs, toads, fish, a variety of small birds and mammals, and eggs.

As defensive behavior the eastern indigo snake vertically flattens its neck, hisses, and vibrates its tail. If picked up, it seldom bites.

It often will cohabit with gopher tortoises in their burrows, although it will settle for armadillo holes, hollow logs, and debris piles when gopher tortoise burrows can't be found. Hunters, hoping to flush out rattlesnakes, often wind up accidentally killing indigo snakes when they illegally pour gasoline into the burrows of gopher tortoises (a practice referred to as "gassing"), even though the tortoises themselves are endangered and protected.

Predators
Humans represent the biggest threat to the eastern indigo snake. Highway fatalities, wanton killings, and overcollection for the pet trade adversely affect indigo snake populations. Snakes are taken illegally from the wild for the pet trade. Eastern indigo snakes are sometimes "gassed" in their burrows by rattlesnake hunters. Along with infrastructure and pet trade, indigo snake populations are drastically declining due to habitat fragmentation. Eastern indigo snake's decline is correlated with the gopher tortoise decline as well since they utilize their burrows for hibernation.

Reproduction
The eastern indigo snake is oviparous. Females will lay a single clutch of 4-14 eggs from late April through early June. Eastern Indigo Snakes are often referred to as late maturing Colubrids. They usually do not reach maturity until they are 3 to 5 years old and around 5 to 6 feet in length. Female Eastern Indigo Snakes have the ability to retain live sperm for long periods, potentially over 4 years. Thus, females are able to choose when to release the sperm to fertilize the eggs. Mating season is at a peak from November to January but can occur from October through March.

Captivity and care
Due to its generally docile nature and attractive appearance, some people find the eastern indigo snake to be a desirable pet, although its protected status can make owning one, depending on location, illegal without a permit. Only a few states require permits to own an eastern indigo snake, but a federal permit is required to buy one from out of state anywhere in the US. The permit costs $100; information about obtaining one can be found by doing a web search. Most states allow unrestricted in-state sales. To thrive in captivity, this snake requires a larger enclosure than most species do, preferably with something to climb on.

One notable owner of a pet eastern indigo snake was gonzo journalist Hunter S. Thompson during the time he wrote his Hell's Angels book. One evening, about 1966, he left his snake - with a mouse to eat - in a cardboard box in the Random House editor's office, but the mouse gnawed through the box and both animals escaped. The snake was subsequently beaten to death by the night watchman, which still caused Thompson great anguish several years later, and was his justification for sending his - often excessive - room service bills to Random House.

Sources

References

Further reading
Conant, Roger; Bridges, William (1939). What Snake Is That?: A Field Guide to the Snakes of the United States East of the Rocky Mountains. (With 108 drawings by Edmond Malnate). New York and London: D. Appleton-Century Company. Frontispiece map + 163 pp. + Plates A-C, 1-32. (Drymarchon corais couperi, pp. 63–65 + Plate 10, figure 27).
Goin, Coleman J.; Goin, Olive B.; Zug, George R. (1978). Introduction to Herpetology, Third Edition. San Francisco: W.H. Freeman. xi + 378 pp. . (Drymarchon corais, p. 117; Drymarchon corais couperi, pp. 124, 308, Figure 16–1).
Holbrook JE (1842). North American Herpetology; or, A Description of the Reptiles Inhabiting the United States. Vol. III. Philadelphia: J. Dobson. 122 pp. (Coluber couperi, new species, pp. 75–77 & Plate 16).
Morris, Percy A. (1948). Boy's Book of Snakes: How to Recognize and Understand Them. (A volume of the Humanizing Science Series, edited by Jaques Cattell). New York: Ronald Press. viii + 185 pp. (Drymarchon corais couperi, pp. 34–36, 179).
Powell R, Conant R, Collins JT (2016). Peterson Field Guide to Reptiles and Amphibians of Eastern and Central North America, Fourth Edition. Boston and New York: Houghton Mifflin Harcourt. xiv + 494 pp., 47 plates, 207 Figures. . (Drymarchon couperi, p. 373 + Plate 33 + Figure 158).
Smith, Hobart M.; Brodie, Edmund D. Jr. (1982). Reptiles of North America: A Guide to Field Identification. New York: Golden Press. 240 pp.  (paperback),  (hard cover). (Drymarchon corais couperi, pp. 188–189).
Zim HS, Smith HM (1956). Reptiles and Amphibians: A Guide to Familiar American Species: A Golden Nature Guide. New York: Simon and Schuster. 160 pp. (Drymarchon corais, pp. 94, 156).

External links
Conservation Management Institute: Eastern Indigo Snake
Encyclopædia Britannica Online: Indigo Snake
Snakesarelong.blogspot.com: Indigo Snakes at Life is Short, but Snakes are Long
2018 Species Status Assessment Report (pdf)

Colubrids
Snakes of North America
Reptiles of the United States
Fauna of the Eastern United States
Taxa named by John Edwards Holbrook
Reptiles described in 1842
ESA threatened species
Apex predators